

Overview 
Spruce Knob Lake is a  reservoir located within the Monongahela National Forest in Randolph County, West Virginia, USA. The recreation area surrounding Spruce Knob Lake contains camping and picnicking facilities as well as a boating site. At an elevation of 3,840 feet, it is the highest lake in West Virginia.

Access
The lake can best be reached by traveling 9.5 miles south of Whitmer on County Route 29 and then 2 miles east of Forest Service Route 1.

See also
Spruce Knob

References

External links
Spruce Knob Lake Campground

Protected areas of Randolph County, West Virginia
Spruce Knob Lake
Monongahela National Forest
Bodies of water of Randolph County, West Virginia